These are the matches of Atlético Madrid playing in Europe.

European Cup/UEFA Champions League

European Cup Winners' Cup/UEFA Cup Winners' Cup

Inter-Cities Fairs Cup

UEFA Cup/UEFA Europa League

Finals

Lost semi-finals

Overall record

By competition
As of 1 November 2022

By country

Notes and references

Europe
Spanish football clubs in international competitions